Mile End was a railway station in Bethnal Green, east London, opened in 1841 by the Eastern Counties Railway on its line between the Shoreditch terminus and Coborn Road.

Shoreditch station was later renamed Bishopsgate, and an additional station called Bishopsgate (Low Level) opened preceding Mile End.

In 1872 a new connection between Liverpool Street, which by then was the new terminus of the Great Eastern Railway, and Hackney Downs was opened and Mile End station was closed and replaced by Bethnal Green Junction just  to the west, which later became known simply as Bethnal Green.

See also
 List of closed railway stations in London

References

Former buildings and structures in the London Borough of Tower Hamlets
Disused railway stations in the London Borough of Tower Hamlets
Railway stations in Great Britain opened in 1841
Railway stations in Great Britain closed in 1872
1841 establishments in England
Former Great Eastern Railway stations